Salmacis or Salmakis, was a naiad in Greek mythology.

Salmacis or Salmakis may also refer to:
Salmacis (Caria), a town of ancient Caria, now in Turkey
Salmacis (fountain), a fountain in Greek mythology
Salmacis (genus), a genus of sea urchins in the family Temnopleuridae